Elvira Mínguez (born 23 July 1965) is a Spanish actress. Mínguez has appeared in such films as La cacatúa verde (1990), El carro de heno (1991), The Lucky Star, Tapas (2005) and El desconocido (2015). Her television credits include Abuela de verano, Mar de dudas, Imperium and El tiempo entre costuras.

Filmography

Films 

 La cacatúa verde (1990)
 El carro de heno (1991)
 Días contados (1994) - Lourdes
 Historias del Kronen (1995) - Camarera
 Cachito (1996) - Nati
 Calor... y celos (1996) - Gaby
 The Lucky Star (1997) - Ana Mari
 Em dic Sara (1998) - Sara
 Lágrimas negras (1998) - Marta
 Diario para un cuento (1998) - Dolly
 El invierno de las anjanas (2000) - María
 El portero (2000) - Úrsula
 Sólo mía (2001) - Andrea
 The Dancer Upstairs (2002) - Llosa
 Canícula (2002) - Isabel
 Trece campanadas (2002) - Carmen
 The Reckoning (2002) - Martha
 Grimm (2003) - Teresa
 Los abajo firmantes (2003) - Carmen
 Tapas (2005) - Raquel
 El buen destino (2005) - Esmeralda
 La caja (2006) - Isabel
 Pudor (2007) - Julia
 Cobardes (2008) - Merche
 Che (2008) - Celia Sánchez
 El desconocido (2015) - Belén
 Truman (2015) - Gloria
 The Chosen (2016) - Caridad Mercader
 Pasaje al amanecer (2016) - Carmen
 Don't Blame the Karma for Being an Idiot (2016) - Úrsula
 The Invisible Guardian (2017) - Flora Salazar
 Everybody Knows (2018) - Mariana
 The Legacy of the Bones (2019) - Flora Salazar
 Mi Vida (2019) - Andrea Cruz
 Ofrenda a la tormenta (2020) - Flora Salazar

TV 
 Mar de dudas (1995) - Charo
 Abuela de verano (2005) - Carmen
 Clara Campoamor. La mujer olvidada (2011) - Clara Campoamor (TV movie)
 Imperium (2012) - Antonia
 El tiempo entre costuras (2013) - Dolores
 Hermanos (2014) - Julia Rodríguez.
 Los nuestros (2019) - Teniente Coronel Iborra
 Instinto (2019) – Doctora Villegas.
 Desaparecidos (2020–) – Carmen Fuentes.

References

External links

Actresses from Barcelona
Spanish television actresses
Spanish film actresses
Living people
1965 births
20th-century Spanish actresses
21st-century Spanish actresses